Gun laws in Hawaii regulate the sale, possession, and use of firearms and ammunition in the state of Hawaii, United States. Hawaii's gun laws are among the most restrictive in the country.

Summary table

Hawaii is a "may issue" state for concealed carry and open carry. "In an exceptional case, when an applicant shows reason to fear injury to the applicant's person or property," a license to carry a pistol or revolver (which allows both open and concealed carry) may be granted or denied at the discretion of the county police chief. After the U.S. Supreme Court’s decision in New York State Rifle and Pistol Association v. Bruen, applications for concealed carry permits have started to be issued on all of the major islands (except Oahu). As of December 2022 the numbers issued on each island are not currently available. Permits are valid in the issuing county only, and are weapon specific, with the permit holder required to both state the actual weapon to be carried, and take a shooting proficiency test with that weapon. Hawaii does not recognize concealed carry permits issued by other states.

Acquiring a firearm in Hawaii requires a permit to acquire, issued to qualified applicants by the county police chief. There is a minimum 14- to 20-day waiting period for receiving a permit. A separate permit is required for each handgun(s) transaction to be acquired (valid for a period of 10 days), while a "long gun" permit can be used for any number of rifles or shotguns for a period of one year. In addition to passing a criminal background check, applicants must provide an affidavit of mental health, and agree to release their medical records. First time applicants are required to pay to be fingerprinted by the FBI. When applying to acquire a handgun, a handgun safety training course affidavit or hunter's education card is also required.

Firearms acquired within the state must be registered with the chief of police within 5 days. Firearms brought in from out of state, including those owned prior to moving to Hawaii, must be registered within 3 days of arrival. Registration of firearms brought in from out of state does not involve a waiting period, however an FBI fingerprint and background check will be conducted. Registration is not required for black-powder firearms or firearms manufactured before 1899.

Carrying a loaded firearm, concealed or not concealed, including in a vehicle is a class B felony. Unloaded firearms that are secured in a gun case and are accompanied by a corresponding permit are allowed to be transported in a vehicle between the permitted owner's residence, business or sojourn and: a place of repair; a target range; a licensed dealer's place of business; an organized, scheduled firearms show or exhibit; a place of formal hunter or firearm use training or instruction; or a police station., unless covered under a current Concealed Carry Permit

Fully automatic firearms, shotguns with barrels less than 18 inches long, and rifles with barrels less than 16 inches long are prohibited by state law. Also banned are handgun magazines that can hold more than 10 rounds of ammunition, and semi-automatic handguns with certain combinations of features that the state has defined as assault pistols.

Non-residents may transport a firearm to the state, which requires registration at a police station within 72 hours of arrival. Current law requires fingerprinting and photograph. A permit is provided for each firearm make/model/serial number. Subsequent registration of other firearms do not require the fingerprinting and photograph (nor the fee). Once registered the permit is valid statewide in all counties.

Firearms that are lost, stolen, or destroyed are required to be reported to the police within 24 hours.

References

Hawaii law
Hawaii